The Borndiep-class was a ship class of 10 minesweepers that served between 1946 and 1962 in the Royal Netherlands Navy (RNN). They were former British Yard Mine Sweepers (BYMS) that were transferred from the Royal Navy to the RNN in 1946.

Design 
The minesweepers of the Borndiep-class were equipped with mechanic, acoustic and magnetic sweepers. The magnetic sweeper consisted of two cables through which electricity would pulse and as a result would create a magnetic field that would detonate magnetic mines. As acoustic sweeper it had a electric hammer clock that would be thrown overboard to create vibrations which resulted in the destruction of acoustic mines. The mechanic sweeper consisted of a cable on each side of the ship with at the end of the cables a floater that would hit a mine to make it detonate.

Service History 
The Borndiep-class was active in the North Sea after the Second World War to cleanup mines that were laid down during the war.
Between 16 and 25 July 1954 several minesweepers of the Borndiep-class took part in the NATO exercise Haul.

Ships in class

Notes

Citations

References

Mine warfare vessel classes
Minesweepers of the Royal Netherlands Navy